
Gmina Wilkowice is a rural gmina (administrative district) in Bielsko County, Silesian Voivodeship, in southern Poland. The gmina also contains the villages of Bystra and Meszna.

Neighbouring gminas
Gmina Wilkowice is bordered by the towns of Bielsko-Biała and Szczyrk, and by the gminas of Buczkowice, Czernichów, Kozy and Łodygowice.

Twin towns – sister cities

Gmina Wilkowice is twinned with:
 Bziny, Slovakia
 Krásná, Czech Republic
 Likavka, Slovakia
 Lubiewo, Poland

References

Wilkowice
Bielsko County